Tassal is a Tasmanian-based Australian salmon farming company founded in 1986. It was listed on the Australian Securities Exchange (ASX) from 2003 until 2022. Tassal is the largest producer of Tasmanian grown Atlantic salmon, supplying salmon to both domestic and international markets. In November 2022, it was purchased by Cooke Seafood of Canada and delisted from the ASX.

Operations 
As of 30 June 2021 Tassal employs a total of 1,712 people, with over 1,000 in Tasmania, 430 in NSW and 200 in Queensland.

Seafood & Prawns 
Operations in Queensland are focused on the expanding Prawn business, with NSW operations also supporting the processing of distribution of other seafood products other than Salmon. 
 Northern Prawn Fishery - Xanadu
 Mission Beach, Queensland - Prawn farm, hatchery & processing facility
 Proserpine, Queensland - Prawn farm, hatchery & processing facility
 Exmoor Station, Queensland - Aquaculture Development Area
 Yamba, New South Wales - Prawn farm & processing facility
 Lidcombe, New South Wales - Seafood processing facility

Salmon

Marine Farming Zones 
Tassal has five marine farming zones, where the standard pen has a volume of 11,600 cubic meters and holds enough salmon to produce 120 tonnes once harvested. Salmon are kept in these large sea cages between 12 and 18 months and continue to grow until they are ready to be harvested at an average weight of 5.0 kg live weight.
 Eastern Zone, Okehampton Bay & Port Arthur
 Channel Zone, D'Entrecasteaux Channel
 Southern Zone, Dover & Huon River
 Western Zone, Macquarie Harbour
 Storm Bay Zone, Nubeena & West of Wedge

Freshwater Hatcheries 
Tassal operates two hatcheries, with a third to be developed, it also has access to the selective breeding program operated by SALTAS on behalf of the Salmon industry in Tasmania.

Combined they have the capacity to produce ten million smolt a year. These smolt come from broodstock from a Tasmanian-based industry selective breeding program. The state-of-the-art Rookwood Road Hatchery and Nursery underwent an expansion in April 2016 to make it the biggest land-based salmon nursery in Australia with the capacity to produce approximately 8 million smolt per year. After 8–12 months at Rookwood Nursery the smolt are transferred to sea.
 Rookwood I & II Ranelagh
 Russell Falls & Karanja Mount Field
 SALTAS (industry hatchery) Wayatinah
 HRAS (future development), Hamilton

Processing Facilities 
Tassal has four processing facilities including a smokehouse one retail outlet and a mobile salmon truck.
 Huonville, Salmon processing
 Margate, Salmon processing
 Dover, Salmon processing
 Triabunna, Rendering facility

Acquisitions 
In September 2018 De Costi Seafoods, a wholly owned subsidiary of Tassal Group, acquired the land, assets and inventory of the Fortune Group prawn aquaculture business.

On 1 July 2015, Tassal announced the acquisition of DeCosti Seafoods.

On 31 December 2007 Tassal announced it was acquiring the assets and intellectual property of Superior Gold from the King Island Company, a wholly owned subsidiary of National Foods, for $26.5m.

On 1 February 2005, Tassal acquired Aquatas from Webster.

Partnerships 
In 2012 Tassal and WWF announced the “WWF Australia and Tassal Sustainable Aquaculture partnership".

Third party certification is currently provided by Aquaculture Stewardship Council (ASC), Best Aquaculture Practices, Global Salmon Initiative.

Sustainability
Tassal began trials into Integrated Multi-Trophic in November 2017, including growing Giant Kelp species alongside its leases in an aim to support improved ecological and environmental outcomes. In 2018 the trials indicated that integrated farming leads to improved environmental outcomes and can also help restore the kelp species in areas in Tasmanian waters where it had been depleted.  Tassal conducted its first successful kelp harvest from the trials in September 2018.

Tassal became the 17th member of the Global Salmon Initiative in February 2018.  In addition, in 2018 they moved towards 100% recycling of their hard and soft plastic.

The investigative television program Four Corners aired an episode in October 2016 which focused on the Tasmanian Salmon aquaculture industry, with issues covered including environmental impact, health and sustainability practices of companies.

On 26 April 2021, award-winning Tasmanian author Richard Flanagan published the controversial non-fiction book Toxic: The Rotting Underbelly of the Tasmanian Salmon Industry, which claims to expose a range of unethical practice in the Tasmanian salmon industry.

Macquarie Harbour 
During November 2016 non-compliances were detected at leases in Macquarie Harbour, where three salmon companies farm. Tassal alerted the EPA to issues and subsequently destocked its Franklin lease in the Harbour. The lease was fallowed for 18 months, during which time Aquaculture Stewardship Council was not pursued for the lease as there were no fish in it.

In May 2017 the ASC found Tassal had failed to comply with 19 requirements for ASC Certification.

In May 2018 Tassal established a joint venture with Petuna to farm in Macquarie Harbour. The goal was to improve stocking strategies, bio-security and allow longer fallowing periods to protect the environment.

Antibiotic use 
Concerns have been raised over the use of antibiotics by the company.

In 2017 Tassal confirmed its use of the antibiotic oxytetracycline, which in 2018 was not used in humans in Australia and rated as low importance by the Australian Strategic and Technical Advisory Group on Antimicrobial Resistance.

Antibiotic use is audited annually by the ASC, whose standards forbid the use of antibiotics from the World Health Organization list of Critically Important Antimicrobials for Human Medicine.

Usage as reported by Tassal, for each annual reporting period:

Awards and recognition 

 In 2021 Tassal was ranked #14 in the global Coller FAIRR Protein Producer Index, the highest for an Australian Company.
 In 2016 Seafood Intelligence benchmarked Tassal as top salmon or trout company in an international report on sustainability reporting and transparency.
 In 2015 CEO Mark Ryan was awarded the Banksia Foundation Richard Pratt CEO award for contributions to sustainability nationally.
 In 2015 Tassal received the Coles “Sustainable and Ethical Excellence” award.
 In November 2014 Tassal became the first salmon farming company globally to achieve the Aquaculture Stewardship Council (ASC) certification across its harvest sites.
 In 2012 Tassal was recognized as an "Employer of Choice" by the Tasmanian Government.

Brands 
Tassal owns several brands, including:
Tassal
Superior Gold
Tasmanian Smokehouse
De Costi Seafoods
Aquatas
Salamanca Seafood Company

References

External links
 

1986 establishments in Australia
Companies established in 1986
Seafood companies of Australia
Companies based in Hobart
Fish farming companies
Companies formerly listed on the Australian Securities Exchange